El Peyote Asesino is an Uruguayan hip-hop and hard rock band that was active from 1994 to 1999. The band members included L. Mental (vocals), Daniel Benia (bass), Juan Campodónico (guitars), P.P. Canedo (drums), and Carlos Casacuberta.  The group released two albums, El Peyote Asesino (Orfeo, 1995) and Terraja (Surco/Universal, 1998), the latter being produced by Gustavo Santaolalla. Terraja 
first received recognition for hit single "Mal de la cabeza".
The name El Peyote Asesino, comes from the hallucinogenic cactus the Huicholes (Mexican indigenous culture) used in their rituals.

History

Beginning

By the time of their second presentation, at Big Bang, the group was complete. Pepe Canedo (drums) and Carlos Casacuberta (voice and guitar). After that show, they continued with many other shows in the underground scene of Montevideo. Unconventional sounds, Mexican slang and distorted guitars were always part of the band. The influence of the Beastie Boys was most notable in this band.
In 1994 they presented their first demo at the "Generación 95" contest sponsored by a national television network show ("Rock de primera") and a radio network ( X FM 100.3). With this demo they won the contest and as a prize they received the possibility of working on an album in a real recording studio, which was recorded between July and August of the following year.

Debut album

On December 1995 their first album '’’El Peyote Asesino'’’ was launched (Orfeo). Gabriel Casacuberta (brother of Carlos Casacuberta) and Luis Restuccia were the ones in charge of the production of this album.
This album sold over a thousand copies, which made it the highest selling rock album in Uruguay, during the first months of 1996. Meanwhile, the group increased their live performances and started coming out of the Montevideo underground scene.
On January of 1996 the band filmed its first video '’’L. Mental'’’ which spread throughout most of the local TV stations.
’'’El Peyote Asesino'’’ the most known track of the album, got a place in the top ten singles of X FM reaching the first spot in only 18 days.

Terraja

During the month of September the band starts recording their second album, Terraja, in the Can Am Recorders studio, city of Los Angeles, California. Once they finished recording it, they went on tour with the Mexican Molotov and Control Machete, playing in many parts of Mexico.
Terraja was finally edited in August 1998, in different countries such as Mexico, Argentina, Uruguay, Puerto Rico and the United States.
The band returned to Argentina, one month after the album was edited, to perform along with Molotov, Cypress Hill, Bersuit Vergarabat and Árbol. Later that month, they played in Uruguay for the last time along with Plátano Macho and Molotov, before they split up for several years.

Reunion and Serial

Ten years after their split up, they performed live at the '’’Pilsen Rock'’’ festival, playinf for 80 thousand people.
and shortly after in the '’’Teatro de Verano'’’.

In 2016 they once again performed in the Teatro de Verano on the nights of 12 and 13 May. Although Carlas Casacuberta wasn't able to play due to health problems. Guests Matias Rada filled on Casacuberta's role instead while Bruno Tortorella played the keyboard. Since 2016, Rada and Tortorella are stable members of the group. In November 2021 the band released Serial, their third album. It was composed and recorded between 2019 and 2020 in Montevideo. It contains ten songs, was recorded by Julio Berta and produced by Juan Campodónico. "This work sums up the artistic maturation of the group very well. It shows in everything, in the music, in the lyrics. I think it is the best of the three albums that Peyote has released" Gustavo Santaolalla, producer of Terraja in 1997, said about Serial .

References

Uruguayan musical groups
Musical groups established in 1994
Musical groups disestablished in 1999
1994 establishments in Uruguay